Concavotectum is an extinct genus of tselfatiiforme bony fish that lived during the Cenomanian in Morocco and possibly Egypt. It was discovered and named in 2008 and is known from a single well preserved hand-sized skull and a few isolated vertebrae discovered in the Kem Kem Group (Gara Sbaa Formation). The type species, C. moroccensis, was named in 2008 and described in 2010. A possible second and third specimen, found in the Baharija Formation, consists of a 2 skulls and several vertebra, which were all destroyed on the night of 24-25 April 1940, during the Boming of Munich in World War II. They are currently the holotype of the possible synonym Paranogmius.

References 

Tselfatiiformes
Late Cretaceous fish
Fossil taxa described in 2008